Afridi Colony) is a neighbourhood in the  Baldia Town municipality of Karachi Pakistan. 

There are several ethnic groups, including Muhajirs, Sindhis, Kashmiris, Seraikis, Pakhtuns, Balochis, Brahuis,
Memons,  etc. Over 99% of the population is Muslim.
The most popular politician in Afridi Colony Baldia Town Mr.Hakeem Khan Swabiwall.

Neighbourhoods 
 Abidabad
 Dhoraji Colony
 Gulshan-e-Ghazi
 Islamnagar
 Ittehad Town
 Muhajir Camp
 Muslim Mujahid Colony
 Nai Abadi
 Naval Colony
 Rasheedabad
 Saeedabad
 Bismillah Chowk
 Delhi Colony 
 Gujrat Colony 
 Kokan Colony
 itthad muhala

See also 
 City District Government
 Karachi
 Lahore
 Veraval Turk Jamaat

References

Neighbourhoods of Karachi